Krohnittellidae is a family of sagittoideans in the order Phragmophora. It consists of one genus, Krohnittella Germain & Joubin, 1912.

Species
Krohnittella boureei Germain & Joubin, 1912
Krohnittella tokiokai Bieri, 1974

References

Chaetognatha
Protostome genera